Pisal is surname mainly found amongst the 96 Maratha clans.

Origin 
Pisal clans, like other Maratha clans, claim a mythic origin. Pisals claim traces their Descendancy Back to the Suryavanshi Chalukyas. Popular people with this surname include Madanrao Pisal, former minister in Maharashtra.

History
Pisal were Deshmukhs of two hundred villages of Wai (Satara District) under the Sultanate of Deccan. Later when Shivaji created the Maratha Empire, they joined him as bargir and shiledar warriors. The Pisal deshmukh were powerful sardars of Chhatrapati Shivaji, Sambhaji, and Rajaram.

On 19 October 1689, Suryajirao Pisal was involved in the defeat of Marathas and Mughals arrested Maharani Yesubai and Prince Shahu, the wife and young son of Sambhaji, respectively. The allegations levied on him were all false and he proved to be instrumental in commencing a pact of Raigadh between Marathas and the Mughals at that crucial period

Pisals also took an active part in building the Maratha Empire, including serving in the Third Battle of Panipat in the year of 1761. Chatrapati Rajaram's Daughter was married to son of Suryaji Pisal.

See also
 Maratha Empire
 List of Maratha dynasties and states
 Maratha War of Independence
 Maratha clan system

References 

Maratha clans
Surnames